Church Hill House is a grade II* listed house in Tanners Lane, Haslemere, Surrey. Parts of the walls are grade II listed as well as the adjoining Church Hill Gate. 

One former occupant in the 1930s was a Mrs Biddie who was arrested at the house in 1940 due to her opposition to the Second World War. According to some reports, she was a follower of Oswald Mosley and ran a Black Shirt Reading Room at the house, which Mosley visited.

References

Grade II* listed buildings in Surrey
Haslemere